John George Harp (born September 26, 1952) is an American politician in the state of Montana. Harp served in the Montana House of Representatives from 1981 to 1988 and in the Montana State Senate from 1989 to 2000. He was majority leader of the Senate from 1995 to 1999.

Personal life 
Harp's wife is Kathy Harp. Harp and his family live in Kalispell, Montana.

References

1952 births
Living people
Politicians from Kalispell, Montana
Politicians from Vancouver, Washington
Businesspeople from Montana
Republican Party members of the Montana House of Representatives
Republican Party Montana state senators